Muru Walters (born 16 January 1935) is a New Zealand author, master carver, broadcaster, artist, former rugby union player and Māori Anglican bishop. He was the first Pīhopa (bishop) of Te Pīhopatanga o Te Upoko o Te Ika from his consecration on 7 March 1992 until his retirement in 2018.

Walters was born in Kaitaia. He affiliates to the Te Rarawa and Te Aupōuri iwi. A talented rugby player, Walters represented New Zealand Māori, and won the Tom French Cup for the Māori rugby union player of the year in 1957. He studied at Auckland Teachers' College. After working in arts and crafts education in schools, he became a lecturer in art at Dunedin Teachers' College. He was later a lecturer in Māori Studies at St John's Theological College in Auckland. In October 2020 Walters was made a Life Fellow of Selwyn College Dunedin.

References

1935 births
Living people
Te Rarawa people
Te Aupōuri people
New Zealand rugby union players
Māori All Blacks players
New Zealand Māori religious leaders
21st-century Anglican bishops in New Zealand
20th-century Anglican bishops in New Zealand
Anglican bishops of Te Upoko o Te Ika